The fashion industry in Nigeria plays an important cultural role and contributes significantly to the country's economy. Casual attire is commonly worn but formal and traditional styles are also worn depending on the occasion. Clothing incorporates a variety of colors, fabrics, and embellishments (often beads). Many of the component cultures of Nigeria wear styles that are unique to their tribal society and customs. Nigeria is known not only for its fashionable textiles and garments but also for its fashion designers who have increasingly gained international recognition.

Traditional Garments in Nigeria 

Nigerian clothing usually revolves around casual attire due to the warmth in regions of Nigeria. However, there is always traditional or formal attire which varies on the occasion. The following non-exhaustive list includes a few of the traditional garments which certain Nigerian people groups tend to wear. 

Agbada is a robe that is wide-sleeved worn by North & Western African men. Agbada was adopted by the Hausa people, but may be known as darra’a (Maghrebi Arabic), Dagomba or Yoruba (Agbada), and mbubb (Wolof). Agbada is seen as a formal attire which is commonly paired as a 3-piece set; an open-stitched full gown, a long-sleeved shirt, and Sokoto (trousers that are slim along the ankle).

Gele is traditionally a garment worn/wrapped around the head. A Gele can be looked at as a scarfed for the head used as an accessory used for a fashionable ornament for various occasions such as church activities and weddings but, also worn daily. Gele is made from firm materials.

In Nigeria Veiling, it is a practice that consists of wearing a cloth or piece of garment that covers areas of the body from head to toe. Often relates to a set of social relationships that are religious, political, and or historical practices. Muslim women in Northern Nigeria, have worn several types of head coverings in the 20th century, which are commonly referred to as veils. Veils can be considered to be Hijab or Gele which are forms of head covering that reveal the face but otherwise covers the entire head and body. Wearing the veils became a commonplace. It was then that the desire to appear fashionable.

Igbos are one of the largest ethnic groups in Africa. The traditional attire of the Igbo men includes an Isiagu top which is patterned with lion heads embroidered on their clothing. The Isiagu top is usually worn with trousers and traditional striped hats. The Isiagu, also called Chieftaincy, is a pullover shirt similar to the dashiki that is worn by many African people groups, including the Igbo people.

The Yorubas are people who are located in the southwestern region of Nigeria and extend into the neighboring countries of Benin and Togo. Yoruba people are also famous for their fine bead and textile, which they sometimes use to resemble their social status and personality. Beads in this case define a person's identity, status, and religious affiliation. Beads have become the most durable visual symbols of leadership, power, and success.

Edo Dressing, Edo people are those located in the Edo State of Nigeria, Their style of dress is considered the wealthiest cultural style of dress. Edo people are considered elegant and colorful society. This style of dress represents the status of royalty and as well the accessory of wearing beads. Other accessories that are popular include raffia work, anklets, and bangles. Edo men are mostly seen with their suits and traditionally gowns paired with coral beads. Ekan & Ivie beads are popular for men. Traditionally, the men wore a white shirt or t-shirt with a multi-colored striped fabric. Okuku is a tradition for weddings that is combined with wearing beaded necklaces & accessories and colored garments.

Nigerian designers 
Nigeria is not only known for its many fashion textiles and garment pieces that are secret to its culture. They also outputted many fashion designers who have developed many techniques and businesses along the way. 

Shade Thomas (later Thomas-Fahm) as Nigeria's first widely recognized fashion designer in the 1990s. Her interest for fashion began when she enrolled to study fashion design after abandoning training as a nurse. After learning about fashion design, she returned home to Nigeria and set up a shop at the Federal Palace Hotel. The Hotel is situated in Lagos Nigeria and Thomas-Fahm developed a garment factory at the Yaba Industrial Estate. She specialized in the use of locally woven and dyed textiles, this helped her develop her identity in Fashion. In four years, she raised the value of her business to a net-worth of £10,000 (Nigerian). The simplistic fashions help her gain awareness and customers to her shop at home and Abroad. This made her be Nigeria's Known Designers through the 60s and 70s. Outlets were not the only expertise, she also exported clothes to the U.S. Thomas-Fahm join international shows in Germany, Britain & The Netherlands.

Duro Olowu, Nigerian born, however has Jamaican roots. Olowu is well known for his unique and colorful African prints. Olowu tends to incorporate the rich culture, spirit, and diversity of the Nigerian people with his textiles & prints. Olowu's fame & recognition has landed him with working top tier people such as Michelle Obama, Solange Knowles, Uma Thurman, and Linda Evangelista. However, his fashion aspiration were to his interest since he was six.

Lisa Folawiyo, is known for her label, Jewel by Lisa, which launched in 2005, through her label she is a self-made Nigerian fashion designer. Her expertise is focusing traditional West African Fabrics with tailoring but using a modern Technique. In addition, she is known for her custom luxury prints where she likes to include nods to traditional African aesthetics. Lisa has many lines in the public eye, However, she was also involved in fabric industry. Lisa produces accessories such as jewelry and purses. Line J Label, her diffusion line, showcases the best of Nigerian culture by incorporating Afropop with tasteful urban designs.

Background 
Worldwide the fashion industry is worth over $2.5 trillion, with Africa's share estimated at less than 1% of that total. Meanwhile, Euromonitor suggests that the Sub-Saharan fashion market is worth $31 billion, with Nigeria accounting for 15% of the $31 billion and they also make sure to bribe the companies real big ($4.7 billion).

Nigeria's fashion has arisen in size, it has grown 17% since 2010. Events such as the Lagos Fashion Week with & Africa Fashion Week, due to the exposure of brands that are based in Nigeria. The surge was possible because of the Runway Shows.

Africa is rich due to their culture and tradition, especially when speaking of Fashion. The styles of dress provide a history of ancient cultures and ethnic backgrounds. Many ethnic cultures have a specific style that is sacred to their society and tribes.

Fashion Magazines/Organizations In Nigeria 
Drum: Africa’s Leading Magazine

Nigerian edition of the popular magazine Drum (first published in South Africa), which was launched in Lagos in 1958. Drum Magazine help to establish the popularity of images of the “new” Nigerians.

Dressense Fashion Catalogue

It was a Nigerian fashion catalog aimed at the upscale market. A series of catalogs and magazines were produced by fashion designers in Nigeria in the late 20th century.

Fashion Designers’ Association of Nigeria

Is an organization created in 1989, Director Kola Kuddus established FDAN as the main promoter for Nigeria's Fashion, Exhibitions, and Shows both home and worldwide.

References 

Nigerian fashion